The 1990 Shoot-Out was a professional non-ranking snooker tournament that took place in September 1990 at Trentham Gardens in Stoke-on-Trent, England.

Darren Morgan won the tournament, defeating Mike Hallett 2–1 in the final. All other matches were decided by a single frame.


Tournament draw

Top half

Section 1

Section 2

Section 3

Section 4

Bottom half

Section 5

Section 6

Section 7

Section 8

Finals

Final

Century breaks
Only one century break was made during the tournament. The second-highest break was 93, compiled by Willie Thorne.
120  Tony Knowles

References

1990
Snooker Shoot-Out
Snooker Shoot-Out
Sport in Stoke-on-Trent